"Amazin'" is the third single from LL Cool J's tenth album, 10. It was released on April 8, 2003 for Def Jam Recordings and was produced by  The Neptunes. "Amazin'" was not a success, peaking at only #73 on the Hot R&B/Hip-Hop Songs. R&B singer Kandice Love was featured on the song.

Track listing

A-Side
"Amazin'"

B-Side
"U Should"

2003 singles
LL Cool J songs
Songs written by LL Cool J